The Petkovica Monastery is a Serbian Orthodox monastery located on Mount Fruška Gora, in the province of Vojvodina, northern Serbia. According to tradition, it was founded by the widow of Stefan Štiljanović, Despotess Jelena. The earliest historical records mentioning the monastery are dated to 1522.

Petkovica Monastery was declared Monument of Culture of Exceptional Importance in 1990, and it is protected by Republic of Serbia.

See also
Monasteries of Fruška Gora - Fruškać
Monasteries of Fruška Gora
Monument of Culture of Exceptional Importance
Tourism in Serbia
List of Serb Orthodox monasteries

References

External links 

Petkovica monastery Fruškać
More about the monastery

Serbian Orthodox monasteries in Vojvodina
Cultural Monuments of Exceptional Importance (Serbia)
16th-century establishments in Serbia
Christian monasteries established in the 16th century
16th-century Serbian Orthodox church buildings